Costin Lazăr (born 24 April 1981) is a Romanian former footballer who played as a defensive midfielder for teams such as Sportul Studențesc, Rapid București, PAOK or FC Voluntari, among others. Lazăr has been capped with Romania at senior level.

Club career

Sportul Studenţesc
Until 2006, Lazăr enjoyed a successful spell at Sportul Studenţesc.

Rapid București
Lazăr joined Rapid București in the summer of 2006. In March 2009, he was involved in an incident in which he was judged to have been fouled in the box by Oţelul's Alexandru Bourceanu. Lazăr, adamant that it was a fair tackle, refused to take the penalty and eventually persuaded the referee to award a drop ball, which his teammate Ovidiu Herea then kicked out for a goal kick.

PAOK
On 21 July 2011, Lazăr signed a three-year contract with PAOK FC after he was chosen by the club coach László Bölöni. He quickly became a key player for the club even after 5 matches. On 25 March, in a game against Kerkyra, Lazăr scored two goals, to help his team to a 4–0 victory.
On 6 January 2013 Costin Lazar scored a wonderful goal for PAOK, winning 4–1 away to Panthrakikos, in a match of the Greece Super League. This goal voted as the best of the week.

Panetolikos
On 19 January 2015, Lazăr signed a six-month contract with Panetolikos F.C.

Iraklis
On 25 June 2015, Lazar signed an annual contract with Greek Superleague club Iraklis.

Career statistics

Club

International goals

Honours

Club
Sportul Studenţesc
Romanian Second League: 2000–01, 2003–04

Rapid București
Romanian Cup: 2006–07
Romanian Supercup: 2007

PAOK
Superleague Greece Runner-up: 2012–13, 2013–14
Greek Cup Runner-up: 2013–14

Voluntari
Romanian Cup: 2016–17
Romanian Supercup: 2017

References

External links

1981 births
Living people
Footballers from Bucharest
Association football midfielders
Romanian footballers
Romania international footballers
Romanian expatriate footballers
Liga I players
Super League Greece players
Expatriate footballers in Greece
Romanian expatriate sportspeople in Greece
FC Sportul Studențesc București players
FC Rapid București players
FC Voluntari players
PAOK FC players
Panetolikos F.C. players
Iraklis Thessaloniki F.C. players
Romanian football managers